The fourth season of Cobra Kai, also known as Cobra Kai IV, released on Netflix on December 31, 2021, and consisted of 10 episodes. The series is a direct sequel to the original four films in The Karate Kid franchise, focusing on the characters of Daniel LaRusso and Johnny Lawrence over 30 years after the original film. It is the second season to be released in 2021 and second to initially release on Netflix after the first two seasons released on YouTube. The season was also released on DVD on September 13, 2022, a few days after the premiere of the show's fifth season. 

The season has twelve starring roles, nine of which returned from the previous season, an additional two were added to main cast after recurring throughout previous seasons, and one was added as a newcomer to the series reprising his role from the film series. The season also featured guest appearances from other characters in the film series, re-introducing two recurring characters after a season-long absence, and featuring a cameo appearance from Carrie Underwood. The fourth season was filmed in early 2021. Two soundtrack albums feature accompanying music from the season and were released on January 7, 2022.  The season received mostly positive reviews from critics and also topped Netflix's global viewership charts within three days of its release.

Cast and characters

Main
 Ralph Macchio as Daniel LaRusso
 William Zabka as Johnny Lawrence
 Courtney Henggeler as Amanda LaRusso
 Xolo Maridueña as Miguel Diaz
 Tanner Buchanan as Robby Keene
 Mary Mouser as Samantha LaRusso
 Jacob Bertrand as Eli "Hawk" Moskowitz
 Gianni DeCenzo as Demetri Alexopoulos
 Peyton List as Tory Nichols
 Vanessa Rubio as Carmen Diaz
 Thomas Ian Griffith as Terry Silver
 Martin Kove as John Kreese

Recurring
 Dallas Dupree Young as Kenny Payne
 Oona O'Brien as Devon Lee
 Griffin Santopietro as Anthony LaRusso
 Aedin Mincks as Mitch
 Khalil Everage as Chris
 Owen Morgan as Bert
 Hannah Kepple as Moon
 Annalisa Cochrane as Yasmine
 Nathaniel Oh as Nathaniel
 Joe Seo as Kyler Park
 Selah Austria as Piper Elswith
 Bret Ernst as Louie LaRusso Jr.
Brock Duncan as Zack Thompson

Guests 
 Okea Eme-Akwari as Shawn Payne
 Dan Ahdoot as Anoush
 Nichole Brown as Aisha Robinson
 Paul Walter Hauser as Raymond "Stingray" Porter
 Carrie Underwood as herself
 Yuji Okumoto as Chozen Toguchi
 Julia Macchio as Vanessa LaRusso
Salome Azizi as Cheyenne Hamidi

Episodes

Production

Development
In October 2020, Netflix renewed Cobra Kai for a fourth season prior to the third season's release. The renewal came following Netflix's acquisition of the series after its previous streamer, YouTube, was not interested in renewing the series for a fourth season due to a shift in content focus. Josh Heald, Jon Hurwitz and Hayden Schlossberg returned as writers and executive producers through their production company, Counterbalance Entertainment. Will Smith, James Lassiter and Caleeb Pinkett also returned as executive producers with the Overbrook Entertainment production company. Series stars Ralph Macchio and William Zabka were co-executive producers. Susan Ekins was the executive producer for distributor Sony Pictures Television. Prior to this season's release, Netflix renewed the series for a fifth season in August 2021.

Casting
All previous series regulars, Ralph Macchio, William Zabka, Courtney Henggeler, Xolo Maridueña, Tanner Buchanan, Mary Mouser, Jacob Bertrand, Gianni DeCenzo and Martin Kove, returned to this season. Vanessa Rubio and Peyton List, who recurred since the first and second seasons respectively, were added to the main cast. Thomas Ian Griffith also joined the main cast as Terry Silver, reprising his role from The Karate Kid Part III. The role for Griffith is his first since 2007 when he turned to writing. Meanwhile, Dallas Dupree Young and Oona O'Brien joined the series in recurring roles to portray Kenny and Devon, two school students who turned to karate. Nichole Brown, who recurred throughout the first two seasons as Aisha Robinson, and Paul Walter Hauser, who recurred in the second season as Stingray, both returned in a guest capacity. Carrie Underwood made a guest appearance in the season as herself, performing a song from the original Karate Kid soundtrack. Yuji Okumoto returned as Chozen Toguchi, and Macchio's daughter, Julia, appeared as Daniel's cousin, Vanessa.

Filming
Filming for the season began in Atlanta, Georgia, on February 26, 2021. Additional filming took place in Los Angeles, California. Filming concluded on April 30.

Music
The Def Leppard song "Rock of Ages" was used in a promotional trailer for the season. "The Moment of Truth", a song originally performed by Survivor and written by Bill Conti, Dennis Lambert, and Peter Beckett for the original film, was performed during the season by Carrie Underwood. Heald stated that Underwood was a fan of the series and that her appearance was kept secret until the performance was filmed, causing an authentic reaction from the extras on set. Other featured music from the season included songs from Judas Priest, Poison, Ratt, Journey, Foreigner, and REO Speedwagon, as well as Mötley Crüe's "Girls, Girls, Girls". Hurwitz said the producers also wanted to include music from AC/DC, Bon Jovi, and Guns N' Roses, but were unable to due budget constraints. The Airbourne song "Breakin' Outta Hell", suggested by music supervisor Michelle Johnson, was used in place of AC/DC's "Thunderstruck", a song that was written into the script but was unable to be used, also due to budget concerns.

Soundtracks
Leo Birenberg and Zach Robinson, who composed for the series since its inception, returned for the season. A promotional single titled "It's Karate Time" was released on December 17, 2021. The soundtrack album was released on January 7, 2022, and consists of two separate volumes. Matt Ryan, who made the vinyl record covers for the previous three seasons, designed the soundtrack's cover art. Madison Gate Records released the two volume soundtrack and La-La Land Records later released an extended CD edition.

Volume 1

Volume 2

Marketing and release
The first teaser trailer was released on August 5, 2021, which featured promotional videos of the cast members and confirmed a December release date for the season, which was set for December 31. An extended trailer advertising the season was later released on December 9. Prior to the season's release, a virtual premiere screening was held on December 28. The screening, limited in number of attendees, featured a welcome from Heald, Hurwitz, and Schlossberg, a full screening of the first episode, and a question and answer session with the cast. The Q&A was released on the series' social media accounts following the screening and was hosted by Jacqueline Coley, an editor at Rotten Tomatoes. The season was released on DVD on September 13, 2022, a few days after the show's fifth season premiered on September 9.

Reception

Critical response

On the review aggregator website Rotten Tomatoes, the season holds a score of 95% with an average rating of 7.9/10 based on 38 reviews. The website's critical consensus reads: "Cobra Kai still delights in a fourth season that mines great fun from shifting alliances, chiefly the uneasy truce between Johnny Lawrence and Daniel LaRusso". On Metacritic, the season has a weighted average score of 70 out of 100 indicating "generally favorable reviews". 
Cristina Escobar with The A.V. Club wrote that the season "nicely continues the journeys of our favorite (and only) Valley karate fanatics, delivering fun along with impressively high kicks, moments of true emotion, and just enough stunted development to keep it all spinning" and praised newcomer Dallas Dupree Young, noting the similarities between his character and Macchio's 
original character from the films. The Chicago Sun-Times Richard Roeper said the season was "quite ridiculous" but remained entertaining. James Dyer, a writer for Empire Online, noted that most plotlines throughout the season were expanded on from the third film in the franchise, but that it "introduces its own existential discord", The IGN  writer Amelia Emberwing felt that it was obvious while watching the season that it was the first to be wholly produced by Netflix; Emberwing however, did state that it was "still one hell of a ride". Rebecca Theodore-Vachon of IndieWire opined that the series "faithfully honors its roots while managing to tell new and compelling stories".

Viewing figures
For the week of December 27, 2021, through January 2, 2022, the season topped the global Netflix most-watched television list. Within the three-day time period 120 million hours of the series was watched; it ranked in the top ten titles of 83 countries, and in 13 of which it was ranked number one. During this week, the series also topped the Nielsen ratings top streaming series list achieving 2.42 billion minutes. The following week beginning January 2, and running through January 9, the season remained in the number one spot on the list bringing in 107 million hours of viewing during the week.

Awards and nominations
At the 28th Screen Actors Guild Awards the season received a nomination for Outstanding Stunt Ensemble in a Television series. The award was lost to Squid Game.

Notes

References

2021 American television seasons
Cobra Kai